Ernest Frederick Upham (24 March 1873 – 23 October 1935) was a New Zealand cricketer who played first-class cricket for Wellington from 1892 to 1910.

Life and career
Ernie Upham bowled right-arm medium pace, batted right-handed in the lower order, and was a fine slips fieldsman. He played for New Zealand several times between 1896 and 1907, in the days before New Zealand gained Test status, including the tour of Australia in 1898–99 and the two matches against Australia in 1905. He took 6 for 84 in the first innings to set up New Zealand's victory over the MCC at the Basin Reserve in 1906–07.

His best first-class innings figures came in the second innings of Wellington's match against Canterbury in 1901–02: Canterbury needed 91 to win, and won by three wickets, but Upham took 7 for 24, bowling six of his victims. His best match figures came two years later when, captaining Wellington against Auckland, he took 6 for 45 and 4 for 44 (match figures of 65.5–28–89–10) in a 90-run victory.

Dick Brittenden said of him: "Upham, a pace bowler of the highest class, indulged in the eccentricity of wearing his cap back to front while he was bowling. He took a run of only about 10 paces, and with a smooth delivery and high right arm, he could achieve a thunderous break-back." When the cricket historian Tom Reese compiled his history of early New Zealand cricket, New Zealand Cricket, 1841–1914, in 1927, he selected a 14-man team of the best New Zealand cricketers of the period from 1860 to 1914. Upham was one of those selected.

Upham spent his working life with the Wellington law firm Bell, Gully and Izard, where he was noted for his knowledge of Māori law. He and his wife had two sons, Cyril and Frank.

References

External links

1873 births
1935 deaths
New Zealand cricketers
Pre-1930 New Zealand representative cricketers
Wellington cricketers
Cricketers from Wellington City
North Island cricketers